James E. Stewart may refer to:

 James E. Stewart (politician) (1814–1890), American politician and judge in Virginia
 James E. Stewart (civil rights leader)